Headington School is an independent girls' school in Headington, Oxford, England, founded by a group of evangelical Christians in 1915. The Good Schools Guide called Headington "A delightful school, [which] nurtures and entertains its pupils while at the same time achieving excellent academic results... fun and stimulating to be at."

History
Headington School was founded in 1915 by a group of evangelical Christians to provide "a sound education for girls to fit them for the demands and opportunities likely to arise after the war". It started at Headington Lodge on Osler Road with just ten boarding and eight-day girls. As the school rapidly expanded after the war, more buildings were bought and added to the school.

In 1920, Davenport House, one of the current boarding houses, (on the corner of London Road and Pullens Lane) was taken over by the school. The house had a  garden and another  of farmland attached stretching as far east as the White Horse pub. The main school then moved to its current building, built in the neo-Georgian style, in 1930. Chiang Yee, "The Silent Traveller", describes it as having an "atmosphere of spacious dignity". In 1942 it was registered as an educational charity, in recognition of the benefits that it provides to its pupils and the wider community.

Headington Prep
The preparatory school is located on a separate site across the junction where Headington Road and Headley Way meet. The premises which house the prep school were originally known as Brookside. They were taken over by the school in 1916. Built in 1886, they were first occupied by Thomas Arnall, Oxford's Head Postmaster. The school renamed them Napier House when they moved out of the original Headington house with that name. Since the prep school moved in, the facilities have been extended but the main house is still in use. Its pupils uses some facilities of the senior school, such as the swimming pool, playing field, all-weather surface and theatre.

Both the prep and senior schools share the same governing body. Until the 2007–08 school year it admitted boys up to age 7. It is a member of the Independent Association of Preparatory Schools.

School Fees
Fees at Headington School include:

 All necessary educational materials (unless otherwise specified)
 School lunches
 Morning snacks

Facilities
The school has embarked on a series of building projects in the past fifteen years, beginning with the Art Department, the professional-standard Theatre at Headington (2002), Napier Boarding House (2003), a large Dining Hall (2005), and most recently the new Music School, which opened in 2009. These complement the original neo-Georgian senior school building constructed in the 1930s.

There are 23 acres of grounds and playing fields, tennis courts, swimming pool and a floodlit Astroturf pitch. The school also owns the Headington School Oxford Boat Club and is one of the few schools in the country to offer equestrian facilities.

Houses
There are ten competitive houses named after landmarks in Oxfordshire or notable historical figures associated with Oxford. Each House is led by a member of staff and a Sixth Form prefect.

Blenheim
Cherwell
Ford
Isis
Latimer
Oxon
Ridley
Windrush

The newest houses to join are Cranmer and Evenlode

Year groups
Headington uses its own nomenclature for the year groups.

Preparatory School

Senior School

Boarding
Headington offers both full-time, part-time or flex-boarding to girls aged 9 and above. Approximately one third of its pupils are boarders. They are grouped by years and reside in four boarding houses.

Davenport: U2 (Year 5) to U4 (Year 9)
Hillstow: U4 to U6 (Year 13)
Napier: L5 (Year 10) to U6
Celia Marsh: L6 & U6 (Sixth Form)
MacGregor: L6 & U6 – attached to Celia Marsh House

Curriculum
Headington is one of the higher achieving independent schools in Oxfordshire.

The International Baccalaureate was offered alongside A Levels from September 2009.

In 2018 Headington School achieved an average IBDP points score of 38.5 per student out of a maximum score of 45 points, making them the 7th best IB school in the UK and the 12th best IB school in the World as per the league tables published by Education Advisers Ltd.

Headington School ceased to offer the International Baccalaureate from September 2020.

Extra-curricular activities
Headington offers over 50 different extracurricular activities ranging from sport to the Duke of Edinburgh Award. Headington's Combined Cadet Force is one of only four all girls contingents in the country.

Sports teams and athletes regularly take part in competitions at county or national level.

The rowing team (Headington School Oxford Boat Club) is one of the county's most successful school teams. It won the girls eights category at the National Schools Regatta in 2001 and completed the rare "Women's triple" in 2009, 2014, 2015, and 2016 by winning the National Schools, Schools Head and Henley. It has also performed well in the South of England Indoor Rowing Championships, winning five overall classes in 2008 and finishing runners-up in 2010. Two of its members were chosen to represent Great Britain at the 2010 Summer Youth Olympics in Singapore and claimed a gold medal in the girls' pair category.

At the 2016 olympic games, former pupil Katie Greves won the silver medal in the women's eight, in what was her third appearance at the Olympic Games.

The Robotics Team won the 2014 Student Robotics Competition. Headington School was the first all-girls team to enter the competition in 2013, and the first all-girls winner in 2014. In 2013 they won the Rookie prize and First Moves, and came 2nd and 16th in the league with their two teams. In 2014 they came 4th in the league and proceeded to pass through all the knockout rounds to win. In 2015 they came 1st in the league and 5th overall, thus making headington the highest placed all girl and majority girl team for the third year running.

The girls provide strong competition in the Oxford Music Festival. In 2013 seven Headington girls won their category and the sixth form vocal ensemble The Eleven received the top choral prize.

Notable former pupils

Freya Allan, actress (The Witcher, Gunpowder Milkshake)
Lily van den Broecke, Great Britain Rowing Paralympian: Gold London 2012
Angela Gallop, British Forensic Scientist 
Fiona Gammond, Great Britain Rowing Olympian
Frances Gardner, cardiologist
Katie Greves, Olympic Silver Medallist, European Champion and Triple Olympian in rowing
Alice Hart-Davis, journalist
Janet Husband, Emeritus Professor of Radiology
Khadija Bukar Abba Ibrahim, Member of the Nigerian House of Representatives
Lady Elizabeth Longford, biographer
Elinor Lyon, children's author
Ann Mallalieu, Baroness Mallalieu, barrister, politician, and president of the Countryside Alliance
Ghislaine Maxwell, former socialite and convicted sex offender
Ann Katharine Mitchell, 1922 - 2020, British codebreaker and social scientist
Christina Onassis, shipping magnate
Julia Somerville, former BBC News and ITV News presenter
Lady Henrietta Spencer-Churchill, daughter of the 11th Duke of Marlborough
Sophie Sumner, model
Jane Tewson, founder of Comic Relief
Emma Watson, actress
Barbara Woodhouse, TV personality and dog trainer
Oluyinka Idowu, 1992 Olympic Games & 1994 Commonwealth Silver Medalist. 
Janet Young, Baroness Young, former Leader of the House of Lords

See also
 Hillstow Annexe, later Dorset House

References

External links
 
 Headington Preparatory School website
 Profile on the Independent Schools Council website
 Profile on the Good Schools Guide
 Headington School Boat Club
 Profile on MyDaughter
 ISI Inspection Reports – Prep School & Main School

Schools in Oxford
Girls' schools in Oxfordshire
Boarding schools in Oxfordshire
Private schools in Oxfordshire
Educational institutions established in 1915
International Baccalaureate schools in England
1915 establishments in England
Member schools of the Girls' Schools Association